Harutzim is a community settlement in central Israel. Located in the Sharon plain near Ra'anana, it falls under the jurisdiction of Hof HaSharon Regional Council.

History
Before the 20th century the area formed part of the Forest of Sharon. It was an open woodland dominated by Mount Tabor Oak, which extended from Kfar Yona in the north to Ra'anana in the south. The local Arab inhabitants traditionally used the area for pasture, firewood and intermittent cultivation. The intensification of settlement and agriculture in the coastal plain during the 19th century led to deforestation and subsequent environmental degradation.

The village was established in 1951. Its name is taken from a biblical verse; (Proverbs 10:4): "The hand of the diligents makes rich."

References

External links
Official website 

Community settlements
Populated places established in 1951
Populated places in Central District (Israel)
1951 establishments in Israel